Diaspora is the dispersion of a population from their native land, particularly involuntary mass dispersions. Originally it referred to the Jewish diaspora.

Diaspora may also refer to:

Common uses
 Any particular diaspora. See List of diasporas
 Diaspora politics
 Diaspora politics in the United States
 Diaspora studies

Games
 Diaspora (role-playing game), a tabletop roleplaying game using the FATE engine

Music
 Diaspora (Natacha Atlas album), 1995
 Diaspora (Christian Scott album), 2017
 Diaspora (GoldLink album), 2019
 Diaspora, an album by Cormorant, 2017
 Disapora, an album by The Ukrainians, 2009

Other uses
 Diaspora (social network), a distributed social network
 Diaspora (novel), a science fiction book by Greg Egan
 Days in the Diaspora, a book by Kamal Ruhayyim
 Diaspora (Apicomplexa), a genus in the phylum Apicomplexa
 Diaspora (spice company), an American company

See also
 Diaspore (botany)
 Diaspore (mineral)
 Exodus (disambiguation)